A list of films produced by the Israeli film industry in 2006.

2006 releases

Awards

Notable deaths

 May 11 – Yossi Banai, Israeli singer and actor.  (b. 1932).

See also
2006 in Israel

References

External links
 Israeli films of 2006 at the Internet Movie Database

Israeli
Film
2006